Jersey Blues FC was an American soccer team based in Morristown, New Jersey, United States. Founded in 2007, the team plays in the National Premier Soccer League (NPSL), the fourth tier of the American Soccer Pyramid, in the Keystone Conference.  From the team's founding until the 2015 season, it was known as Morris County Colonials.  In May 2015, the name and branding change to Jersey Blues FC was announced.

The team plays its home games at Robert T. Shields Field on the campus of Fairleigh Dickinson University College at Florham in nearby Madison, New Jersey. The team's colors as the Morris County Colonials were burgundy, white and gold, but switched to white and blue after the team's identity was switched to Jersey Blues FC.

The Colonials organization is owned and operated by the New Jersey Soccer Group, a management company for a family of soccer-based companies offering soccer services in New Jersey.

History

Players

2012 Roster
Source: [1]

Former players

 Samuel Bryant (2009)
 Hugo Ferreira (2008)
 Miguel Fontan (2008–09)
 Steve Jakubowski (2009–11)
 Ansger Otto (2009)
 Leroy Sequeira (2008)
 Daniel Sauerhoff (1801-1805)
 Edwardo Sanchez (2008–09)
 Paco de Lucía (2008–09)
 Joselito (2008–09)
 Hernán Cortés (2008–09)
 Doug Funny (2009)
 Forrest Whiteside (2009)
 Don Finklestein (2008)
 Leandro Fioretti (2008)

Year-by-year

Head coaches
  Adrian Borrows (2008)
  Rob Alman (2009–2011)
  John Ryan (2011)
  Christopher Greatwich (2012)
  Tom Worthington (2012–Present)

Home stadiums
 Burke Field at Morristown-Beard School, Morristown, New Jersey (2008)
 Dr Keith A. Neigel Field at Millburn High School, Millburn, New Jersey (2009)
 Robert T. Shields Field at Fairleigh Dickinson University College at Florham; Madison, New Jersey (2010–2013)
 Drew University Ranger Stadium at Drew University, Madison, New Jersey (2015–present)

References

External links
 
 NPSL Official Site
 New Jersey Soccer Group Official Site

Madison, New Jersey
National Premier Soccer League teams
Soccer clubs in New Jersey
2007 establishments in New Jersey
Association football clubs established in 2007